Hogeboom is a surname. Notable people with the surname include:

Gary Hogeboom (born 1958), American football player
Gregory Hogeboom (born 1982), Canadian ice hockey player
Henry Hogeboom (1809–1872), American judge
John T. Hogeboom, American farmer, lawyer, and politician

See also
Stephen Hogeboom House